Wichian Khamcharoen (12 April 1935 — 10 December 2016) or Lop Burirat was a Thai Luk thung songwriter. He was a regular songwriter for Thai Luk thung singer Pumpuang Duangjan. His songs include "Nad Phop Na Amphoe", "Krasae Khao Ma Si", "Uhue Lor Jang", "Nguen Na Mee Mai", "Amija Tinger", "Noo Mairoo", "Khoe Hai Ruay", etc. He was awarded National Artist of Thailand in 2005.

Early life 
He was born in Lopburi Province. He finished educated in Primary 4. He loved music and song, and he dreamed of becoming a songwriter.

Career 
He went to Bangkok and joined Luk thung band. In 1989, he met with Praiboon Butrkhan and enrolled to study as a songwriter. His first song is "Kod Mon Non Pher" (sung by Tul Thongjai). After that, he joined Chularat Luk thung band as their songwriter. He then went solo. He became popular as the regular songwriter of Pumpuang Duangjan from 1980 until Pumpuang's death in 1992. He also composed songs for Yodrak Salakjai ("Sam Sip Yang Jaew"), Sornphet Sornsuphan ("Jai Ja Khad") and Jintara Poonlarp ("Jod Mai Lay Chabab"), too.

He died on 10 December 2016, age 77.

Awards
 2005 – National Artist of Thailand
 2013 – Fourth Class of the Order of the Direkgunabhorn

References

1939 births
2016 deaths
Wichian Khamcharoen
Wichian Khamcharoen
Wichian Khamcharoen
Wichian Khamcharoen